The Texas Juvenile Probation Commission (TJPC) was a state agency of Texas, headquartered in the Brown-Heatley Building in Austin. As of December 1, 2011, the agency was replaced by the Texas Juvenile Justice Department.

The TJPC oversaw county-operated youth detention facilities and partners with area juvenile boards and probation departments to serve youth probation services throughout Texas.

See also

 Texas Youth Commission

References

Further reading
Harnsberger, R. Scott. A Guide to Sources of Texas Criminal Justice Statistics [North Texas Crime and Criminal Justice Series, no.6]. Denton: University of North Texas Press, 2011.

External links
 Texas Juvenile Probation Commission

State agencies of Texas